Vinderup Municipality is a former municipality (Danish, kommune) in Region Midtjylland on the Jutland peninsula in west Denmark.  The former Vinderup municipality covered an area of 224 km2, and had a total population of 8,035 (2005).  Its last mayor was Holger Hedegaard, a member of the Venstre (Liberal Party) political party. The main town of the municipality was the railway town of Vinderup.

 Ejsing Parish
 Handbjerg Parish
 Ryde Parish
 Sahl Parish
 Sevel Parish
 Trandum Parish
 Vinderup Parish.

On January 1, 2007, Vinderup municipality ceased to exist due to Kommunalreformen ("The Municipality Reform" of 2007).  It was merged with Holstebro and Ulfborg-Vemb municipalities to form an enlarged Holstebro municipality.  This created a municipality with an area of 790 km2 and a total population of 56,204.

External links 
 Holstebro municipality's official website (Danish only) ą

References 
 Municipal statistics: NetBorger Kommunefakta, delivered from KMD aka Kommunedata (Municipal Data)
 Municipal mergers and neighbors: Eniro new municipalities map

Former municipalities of Denmark